The Adaffa Formation is a Geological formation in Saudi Arabia, and the lowermost unit of the Suqah Group. It dates back to the Campanian of the Late Cretaceous. The lithology consists of sandstone, siltstone and marl, with a basal granitic conglomerate with phosphatic nodules. Also present are ferricrete horizons. It was deposited in marginal marine conditions close to land. Fish, marine reptile and dinosaur remains have been recovered from the formation.

Vertebrate paleofauna

Fish

Crocodyliformes

Plesiosaurians

Squamates

Turtles

Non-avian Dinosaurs

References 

Geology of Saudi Arabia
Upper Cretaceous Series of Asia
Campanian Stage
Sandstone formations
Siltstone formations
Marl formations
Conglomerate formations
Paleontology in Saudi Arabia